Georges Diebolt, sometimes spelled Diébolt, (6 May 1816, Dijon – 7 November 1861, Paris) was a French sculptor best known for his publicly commissioned monumental works, including The Zouave and  on the pont de l'Alma in Paris and the Maritime Victory on the Pont des Invalides.

Life
Trained at the École nationale supérieure des Beaux-Arts in Paris, he then went to the Villa Medici after winning the Prix de Rome in 1841, towards the end of the reign of King Louis-Philippe. He came to be valued for works in an academic style which prefigured his 1841 plaster bas-relief La mort de Démosthène (now at the École nationale supérieure des Beaux-Arts), or La Villanelle, exhibited at the Salon of 1848 and remarked upon by Théophile Gautier, who described it as 

He also produced some more or less romantic paintings, such as Hero and Leander (exhibited in the "grande galerie XIXe siècle" of the Musée Roger-Quilliot at Clermont-Ferrand).

His short career as a sculptor profited largely from public commissions under the Second French Empire—he was much sought-after for monumental works and received the Légion d'honneur, before dying at only 45.

Works
Diebolt treated with equal eclecticism religious subjects such as Saint John the Evangelist (placed on the first story of the tower of Saint-Jacques in Paris during its 1852 restoration) and modern themes, such as the 1854 Maritime Victory on the pont d'Austerlitz.

He also produced pieces for public fountains, such as that at Nîmes with James Pradier or some of the statues decorating the new Louvre building inaugurated by Napoleon III in 1857. Also his are some of the works dominating the Palais des Arts et de l'Industrie, built for the Exposition universelle of 1855, which were re-erected in the Parc de Saint-Cloud when this building was demolished.

He gained his fame above all, however, by his participation in the decoration of the pont de l'Alma in Paris, for which he sculpted The Zouave and The Grenadier, commissioned to pay homage to the French army's part in the Crimean War and inaugurated on 15 August 1858. These monumental works (6 metres high and weighing several tonnes) were removed when the bridge was refaced in 1963. The Zouave, to which Parisians had become attached, was re-attached to the bridge near the right bank of the Seine and continues to serve as a flood-level indicator.

Contemporaries
Georges Diebolt was the contemporary of better known artists such as James Pradier (1792–1852, a friend of Victor Hugo), Antoine-Louis Barye (1796–1875, the sculptor of animals), or Jean-Baptiste Carpeaux (1827–1875, whose celebrated group The Dance dates to 1869). He also knew Frédéric Auguste Bartholdi (1834–1904), creator of (among other works) the Statue of Liberty in New York and the Lion de Belfort, and Emmanuel Frémiet (1824–1910), who sculpted the Joan of Arc in place des Pyramides and the Saint Michael on the top of the spire at Mont-Saint-Michel.

Among Diebolt's students was the sculptor Louis-Léon Cugnot.

Prix de Rome for sculpture
Chevaliers of the Légion d'honneur
Artists from Dijon
1816 births
1861 deaths
19th-century French sculptors
French male sculptors
École des Beaux-Arts alumni
19th-century French male artists